Gregg Burge (November 14, 1957 – July 4, 1998) was an American tap dancer and choreographer.

Career
Burge graduated from New York's prestigious Fiorello H. LaGuardia High School of Performing Arts in 1975. His credits ranged from television's The Electric Company to the film version of A Chorus Line (1985), for which he served as assistant to choreographer Jeffrey Hornaday and performed the role of Richie, as he later did on Broadway.

A tap dancer from the age of 7, Burge won a scholarship to study at the Juilliard School when he was 17.

Burge was nominated for two Drama Desk Awards, twice won the Fred Astaire Award, receiving accolades for his Broadway performances in Song and Dance and Oh, Kay! for which he received a Tony Award nomination. He performed as the Scarecrow for four years in the Broadway production of The Wiz and appeared in the long-running Sophisticated Ladies.

Burge choreographed Michael Jackson's "Bad" music video (directed by Martin Scorsese) with Jeffrey Daniel and a video for the reggae band Steel Pulse, and operated a dance studio on Long Island.

Death
Burge died of a brain tumor in Atlanta on July 4, 1998 at age 40.

Filmography
{ 1996
! Soul of the Game
! Bill Bojangles Robinson
! Notes
|-
|1985|| A Chorus Line || Richie ||
|-
|1988|| School Daze || Virgil Cloyd ||
|}

External links

1957 births
1998 deaths
20th-century American male actors
20th-century American singers
African-American choreographers
African-American male actors
African-American male dancers
African-American male singers
American choreographers
American male dancers
American male film actors
American male musical theatre actors
American male singers
American male stage actors
American tap dancers
Fiorello H. LaGuardia High School alumni
Neurological disease deaths in Georgia (U.S. state)
People from Merrick, New York